Surinder is an Indian masculine given name. Notable people with the name include:

Surinder Amarnath (born 1948), former Indian Test and One Day International cricketer
Surinder Arora, Punjabi English businessman whose hotel business is believed to make him worth £225 million
Surinder Singh Bajwa (1955–2007), the Deputy Mayor of Delhi
Surinder Singh Kairon, the son of late Sardar Pratap Singh Kairon
Surinder Kapoor (1925–2011), Bollywood film producer, President of the Film & Television Producers Guild of India 1995–2001
Surinder Kaur, Punjabi singer-songwriter
Surinder Kaur (field hockey) (born 1982), member of the India women's national field hockey team
Surinder Khanna (born 1956), former Indian cricketer
Surinder Kumar, academic and entrepreneur
Surinder Pal (born 1953), Indian film and television character actor
Surinder Sandhu, sarangi player and composer
Surinder Shinda, Indian singer of bhangra music with traditional Punjabi roots
Surinder Singh, Indian classical singer, of musical duo Singh Bandhu
Surinder Singh Sodhi, former field hockey player from India
Surindar Kumar Trehan, Indian mathematician
Surinder Vasal (born 1938), World Food Prize laureate

See also
Surendra, another given name
Surinder Singh Kanda v. The Government of the Federation of Malaya (1962) 28 MLJ 169

Indian masculine given names